Gujar may refer to:

Gurjar, Gujjar or Gujar, an ethnic group mainly in Afghanistan, India and Pakistan
Gojari language or Gujjar, a language spoken by the Gujjar people of Afghanistan, Pakistan and India
Gujar, Iran (disambiguation)
Gujar, Nepal, a town in Nepal
Gujar Khan, nephew of Ataga Khan who fought against Akbar's army at the Battle of Tukaroi
Gujar Kurashvili (born 1951), Georgian general

Language and nationality disambiguation pages